Pinhay is a hamlet in the civil parish of Combpyne Rousdon in the East Devon district of Devon, England.

Pinhay is home to Pinhay Bay, a large face of cliffs which lies along the Jurassic Coast. To the eastern side of Pinhay Bay are the Ware Cliffs, which also gives its name from its hamlet.

Hamlets in Devon